Ndé is one of the 58 divisions in Cameroon. It is located in the West region of the country, about 150km from Douala, the economic capital, and about 265 km from Yaoundé, the political capital. Its estimated population is 304,800. There are two meanings that are attached to the acronym Ndé: The first and most popular is Nobility, Dignity, Elegance. The second meaning is New, Deal, Economy. Bangangte has been the headquarter of the Ndé division since June 14, 1961. Medumba is the most common language spoken in the region. Its kingdoms include: Bangangte, Bangoulap, Balengou, Bazou, Bakong, Bamena, Tonga (Badounga), Bahouoc, Bangang-Fokam, Bawock, Bangoua, Batchingou, Bamaha and Bagnoun. The main religious belief is Christianity, with the two main denominations being Catholics and Protestant. Its climate ranges between 14- 22 Celsius at night and between 24-30 Celsius. Some anthropological research has been done by Pradelles de Latour.

Subdivisions
The department is divided administratively into 4 communes and in turn into villages.

Communes 
 Bangangté
 Bassamba
 Bazou
 Tonga
 Balengou
 Bamena

References

Departments of Cameroon
West Region (Cameroon)